George J. Nesbitt (1870/71 – after 1925) was an Irish businessman and Free State senator from Kimmage, Dublin.  He was manager of Kernan & Co, a mineral water producer in Camden Street. He married Enid (b.1880/81) in 1906 or 1907. He was a member of the National Literary Society and a founding member of the Irish National Theatre (now the Abbey Theatre). He was among those who left the Theatre in 1906 to form the Theatre of Ireland, where he served as stage manager.

In 1916, he was active in the Irish National Aid Association, which supported republicans killed or imprisoned after the Easter Rising and their dependents. In 1918 he was appointed co-treasurer of Sinn Féin, alongside Jennie Wyse Power, after the previous board were arrested during the "German Plot" scare. During the Irish War of Independence, he was interned in Ballykinler camp, where he staged a play on Easter Sunday 1921. In 1922, he was among the founders of Irish Photoplays, which financed three feature films.

He was a member of the Seanad of the Irish Free State from its creation in 1922, being 26th of the 30 Senators elected by the Third Dáil. He was an independent, though generally supportive of the then government of Cumann na nGaedheal. He nominated himself for re-election in the 1925 Seanad election, finishing 59th of 76 candidates for 19 seats.

Sources

References

Members of the 1922 Seanad
Prisoners and detainees of the British military
Independent members of Seanad Éireann
Politicians from Dublin (city)
Irish film producers
Abbey Theatre
1870s births
Year of death missing
Theatre people from Dublin (city)